Åse Gruda Skard (née Koht) (2 December 1905 – 13 August 1985) was a Norwegian university professor, child psychologist and author. She was a noted pioneer in the field of childhood development and psychology.

Biography
She was born at Kristiania (now Oslo), Norway. 
She was the daughter of Halvdan Koht  (1873–1965) and Karen Elisabeth Grude (1871–1960). Her father was a noted historian and professor and the University of Oslo. Her mother was an educator, author and  feminist pioneer. Her brother Paul Koht (1913–2002) was a  diplomat and ambassador.

In 1931, she  obtained a Master's degree in Psychology from the University of Oslo. After a year of study in the United States, she got a job as a scientific assistant in the Department of Psychology at the University of Oslo in 1933.

During the Occupation of Norway by Nazi Germany (1940-1945), she re-located to the United States. During this period, she lectured at Wilson College in Chambersburg, Pennsylvania. After the liberation of Norway, she lectured in psychology with emphasis on child psychology at the University of Oslo from 1947 to 1973.

In 1934, she established the Norwegian Psychology Association (Norsk psykologforening) and served as chairman 1945-1949.
She edited the journal Norsk pedagogisk tidsskrift from 1936 to 1970. She wrote 24 books and almost 2,000 journal articles.

Personal life
She was married to Sigmund Skard (1903–95). Her husband was a professor of literature at the University of Oslo. She was the mother five children including  twin daughters, Målfrid Grude Flekkøy (1936–2013) and Torild Skard  (born 1936),  both of whom were trained psychologists who were associated with  UNICEF. Her son Halvdan Skard (born 1939) served as chairman of the Arts Council Norway.

In 1980, she was appointed  a  Knight first class in the Order of St. Olav and received an honorary Doctorate Degree from the University of Bergen.
She died during 1985 and was buried beside her husband at Haslum kirkegård in Bærum.

Selected works
Pedagogisk psykologi (1937, jointly with Karen Grude Koht)
Barn i vardagslivet (1940)
Ungene våre (1948) 
Vanlige vansker med vanlige barn  (1965)
Praktisk barnepsykologi (1972)
Liv laga. Ei minnebok 1905–1940 (1985)

References

External links 
Family genealogy
Åse Gruda Skard-prisen

1905 births
1985 deaths
Psychologists from Oslo
University of Oslo alumni
Academic staff of the University of Oslo
Norwegian women psychologists
Norwegian women academics
Child psychologists
Norwegian expatriates in the United States
Norwegian Association for Women's Rights people
20th-century psychologists